Nordic Valley may refer to:
Wolf Mountain ski resort, which was named Nordic Valley until June 2005
Nordic Valley, Utah, the unincorporated community surrounding the ski resort